Population Connection (formerly Zero Population Growth or ZPG) is a non-profit organization in the United States that raises awareness of population challenges and advocates for improved global access to family planning and reproductive health care. The organization was founded in 1968 by Paul R. Ehrlich, Richard Bowers, and Charles Remington in the wake of Ehrlich's best-selling book, The Population Bomb. The organization adopted its current name in 2002.

Mission
"Overpopulation threatens the quality of life for people everywhere. Population Connection is the national grassroots population organization that educates young people and advocates progressive action to stabilize world population at a level that can be sustained by Earth's resources."

Population Connection is the largest grassroots population organization in the United States, with 40,000 dues-paying members. Population Connection works to ensure that everyone around the world who wants to delay or end childbearing has access to the health services and contraceptive supplies they need.

Issues and campaigns
 Connections between population, health, and the environment, in the United States and around the world
 U.S. foreign assistance funding for international family planning
 U.S. funding for the domestic family planning program for low-income Americans, Title X
 Ending U.S. policies that restrict access to family planning and reproductive health care, including safe abortion, domestically (e.g. Hyde Amendment) and internationally (e.g. Global Gag Rule, Helms Amendment, restrictions on funding for UNFPA)
 Comprehensive (as opposed to abstinence-only) sex education for American teens

Initiatives

Education 
Population Connection's education program, known as Population Education or PopEd, develops K-12 curricula and conducts professional development workshops for teachers that focus on human population issues. Since 1975, the program has developed age-appropriate curricula to complement students’ science and social science instruction about human population trends and their impacts on natural resources, environmental quality, and human well-being. The program staff and their network of regional volunteers facilitate approximately 550 workshops each year for 11,000 teachers and future teachers throughout Northern America. PopEd lesson plans educate over three million American and Canadian students on population challenges each year. Population Education also hosts an international student video contest each year through their World of 7 Billion website.

Activism 
Population Connection Action Fund is the political arm of Population Connection. Founded in 2013, their mission is to educate the American people and advocate progressive action to stabilize world population at a level that can be sustained by Earth's resources.

Population Connection and Population Connection Action Fund co-sponsor an annual advocacy event in Washington, D.C., called Capitol Hill Days. During the event, activists attend information sessions, learn advocacy techniques, and lobby on Capitol Hill for the elimination of the Global Gag Rule, for a greater U.S. investment in international family planning, and for a reliable contribution to UNFPA.

Population Connection Magazine
Population Connection is Population Connection's quarterly publication. The magazine highlights the connections between overpopulation, the environment, poverty, and women's empowerment. It provides important population news, research, program developments, and legislative updates. Annual membership ($25) includes a one-year subscription to Population Connection magazine. All contributions, bequests, and gifts are fully tax-deductible in accordance with current laws.

See also 
 List of population concern organizations
 Zero population growth

References

External links
 

1968 establishments in the United States
501(c)(3) organizations
Human overpopulation think tanks
Non-profit organizations based in Washington, D.C.
Organizations established in 1968
Political advocacy groups in the United States
Population concern organizations
Political and economic think tanks in the United States
Population concern advocacy groups
Population research organizations
Population organizations
Sustainability organizations